Nadia Petrova was the defending champion of tournament's last edition, but lost in the first round to Alona Bondarenko. Jelena Janković won in the final 6–4, 6–2 against world No. 1 Dinara Safina.

This tournament marked the return of Kim Clijsters from the sport after her first retirement, having not played a match since May 2007. She advanced to the quarterfinals, where she was beaten by Safina.

Seeds
The top eight seeds receive a bye into the second round.

 Dinara Safina (final)
 Serena Williams (third round)
 Venus Williams (third round)
 Elena Dementieva (semifinals)
 Jelena Janković (champion)
 Svetlana Kuznetsova (third round)
 Vera Zvonareva (third round)
 Caroline Wozniacki (quarterfinals)
 Victoria Azarenka (third round)
 Nadia Petrova (first round)
 Ana Ivanovic (second round)
 Marion Bartoli (first round)
 Agnieszka Radwańska (second round)
 Flavia Pennetta (semifinals)
 Dominika Cibulková (first round)
 Virginie Razzano (first round)

Main draw

Finals

Top half

Section 1

Section 2

Bottom half

Section 3

Section 4

See also 
2009 Western & Southern Financial Group Masters and Women's Open

External links
Draw and Qualifying Draw

Women's Open - Singles